Tesoro mio (also spelled Tesoromio) is a 1979 Italian romantic comedy film directed by Giulio Paradisi. It is based on the comedy play Chérie noire by Francois Campaux.

Plot
Playwright irreparable failure is betrayed by a concubine with the lawyer that finances the charade. But one day arrives at his house Honey, Eastern African domestic workers to first service, to boot, is a billionaire and of royal blood.

Cast 
 Johnny Dorelli as Enrico Moroni
 Zeudi Araya as Tesoro Houaua
 Sandra Milo as Solange
 Renato Pozzetto as  Pierluigi
 Enrico Maria Salerno as  Roberto Manetta
 Carlo Bagno as Maggiordomo 
 Vincenzo Crocitti as membro della commissione al teatro

References

External links

1979 films
1970s Italian-language films
1979 romantic comedy films
Italian romantic comedy films
Films directed by Giulio Paradisi
Films scored by Detto Mariano
Films about theatre
Italian films based on plays
Adultery in films
Films about interracial romance
1970s Italian films